Blackdown Tableland is a national park in the Central Highlands Region, Queensland, Australia.

Geography 
The mountainous terrain of the tablelands provides a unique landscape featuring gorges, waterfalls and diverse vegetation.

The Blackdown Tableland is a  sandstone plateau rising abruptly from the plains below. Many creeks on the Tableland have developed gorges and waterfalls along their courses, the most notable of which drains in to the spectacular Rainbow Falls (Gudda Gumoo) over a  drop.  Some of the creeks on the Tableland are catchment fed by rain and often dry up, and some are spring fed and always flow even just a small amount. The national park is located in the north east of the central Queensland sandstone belt.

The tablelands are positioned at the junction of the Shotover, Expedition and Dawson Ranges. Evidence of folding is shown in the rises and depressions amongst the ranges.

History 
It is the traditional home of the Ghungalu people, whose rock art can be found in the park.

Wadja (also known as Wadjigu, Wadya, Wadjainngo, Mandalgu, and Wadjigun) is an Australian Aboriginal language in Central Queensland. The language region includes  the local government areas of the Aboriginal Shire of Woorabinda and Central Highlands Region, including Blackdown Tableland, the Comet River, and the Expedition Range, and the towns of Woorabinda, Springsure and Rolleston.

Climate
The plateau has a more temperate, local climate than the surrounding plains, supporting open forests, heath, ferns, and a variety of plants and animals, several of which are not found anywhere else. Dense fog may shroud the plateau.

Facilities
Camping is permitted at Munall campground. There are walking tracks leading to lookouts, heritage sites and creeks. Picnic facilities are available at Yaddamen Dhina lookout.

Camping is available on Mimosa Creek in the Tableland, camping fees apply.

Access
Access to the area was very limited until a road was constructed in 1969 by the Queensland Forest Department.

See also

 Protected areas of Queensland

References

External links
 Blackdown Tableland National Park
 Queensland Holidays: Blackdown Tableland National Park Photo Gallery

National parks of Central Queensland
Protected areas established in 1991
1991 establishments in Australia
Plateaus of Australia